Nardoqan or Nardugan (Kazakh: нардуган, Turkish: Nardoğan or Nardugan,  Azerbaijani: Narduqan) was a Turkic holiday concept. Nowadays, it is most commonly used to refer to the winter solstice in many Central Asian and Siberian languages. It is also used as an equivalent name for the Christian holiday Christmas.

Etymology
The root of the word is not clear. But associated with following words;
Old Turkic : Nar - The Sun
Mongolian: Нар (Nar) - The Sun
Oirat: Нарн (Narn) - The Sun
And Turkic verb Doğmak (that means to born or to rise) merged and combined with this root. Also it means the "Newborn Sun".

Mythological significance
Nardoqan or Narduğan was celebrated by Turks on December 21, the longest night of the year and the night of the winter solstice. On this night, symbolizing old sun, becomes smaller as the days become shorter in the Northern Hemisphere, and dies on December 22, the winter solstice. It is said to be defeated by the dark and evil powers. On December 23 becomes the new sun.

While some scholars trace the origins of the Christmas tree to pagan rituals in pre-Christian Britain, others suggest the tradition was borrowed from ancient Germanic peoples. However, Turkish archaeologist Muazzez Ilmiye Çığ advocates the idea that the Turks were the ones who invented the Christmas tree.

The Christmas tree, a brightly adorned symbol for Christians on one of their holiest days, also represents a link to the ancient Turks of Central Asia, according to the Turkish archaeologist.

According to this theory, its origins are not in Norse myth or British isle paganism, as most Western historians believe, but in the Turkic tradition of the “wish-making tree.” But not all Turkish scholars agree, saying the notion that the Turks invented the Christmas tree is simply wishful thinking.  

Europeans, Muazzez Ilmiye Çığ argues, adopted a rite to their own holiday ritual that stems from an old Turkish custom in which people decorated a special tree to offer their thanks to God.  

“People put special things under a white pine as a present to God in response to his benefaction during the year,” said Çığ, adding that the custom first arose in Turkic Central Asia. “They also tied some pieces of cloth to its boughs to make a wish for the following year.” 

“Adorning the tree is a small part of a festivity that is linked with the holiness of the sun for Turks,” Çığ said. “It unites family members in enjoyable activities. They clean homes, sing folk songs, eat special foods and put on festive clothing.” 

According to mythology, the god Ulgen lives atop the special tree extending from the earth's surface to the sky. His mission is to arrange the arrival of days and nights. Day and Night are continually quarrelling about who will be the first to come.

Day, however, finally defeated the Night on Dec. 22. Thereafter, the Turks celebrated this day as a festival of rebirth. 

“According to some historical sources, the white pine is planted only in Central Asia, and Palestinians did not know anything about that pine,” she said. “It is another indication that the Christians received this custom from the Turks, although Jesus’ religion emerged from the Middle East.”  

“When the first Christian Council gathered in Nicaea (now Iznik, Turkey), all bishops accepted this festivity as a symbol for the birth of Jesus, although it was commonly seen as a pagan practice in that era,” Çığ said. “They decided to celebrate Christmas Day, the birth of Jesus, on Dec. 24. Thus, the custom began to integrate into the culture of Christianity.”

In A.D. 325, the great Council of Nicaea was called by Constantine the Great, who had converted to Christianity a decade earlier. It was the first worldwide council of the church that is recognized by most Christian denominations as having doctrinal authority.  

“At first, the birth of Jesus was celebrated without decorating a Christmas tree. Through the increasing influence of Turkish-origin festivities across Europe, however, the first Christmas tree in the traditional sense was adorned in Germany in 1605. Similar practices were later seen in France. This practice gradually spread throughout the world from France,” she said, claiming it was Hunnish warriors who originally brought this custom into Europe. 

A prominent writer strongly backed Çığ's claim that decorating Christmas trees came from an old Turkish custom.

“Turkic tribes had been immigrating to Europe from the northern Black Sea since the seventh century A.D. They gradually became a dominant culture in Europe. While Christianity spread in Europe, the traditional patterns of Turkish culture influenced Christian culture,” said İbrahim Okur, who is known for his book, “Turks and Europe throughout History.” 

“Çığ has actually sent a message to Europe to suggest how much Turks influenced Europe’s history and culture,” he said. 

But a researcher known for his works on Christianity believes Çığ's argument is a highly sensitive claim that requires more research. 

“It is impossible to know when or if Turkic tribes first erected a tree for celebration. But if science proves her claim, we should review all we know about Christianity,” said Altunç Altındal. 

“Acceptable historical sources say that erecting a Christmas tree is a Nordic custom dating back to the 19th century,” he said. “If we delve into the subject more deeply, we may find that this custom dates back to before the 19th century.”

See also
 Ayaz Ata
 Yaldā Night
 Halloween
 Kosaqan
 Paktaqan
 Paynaqan
 Saturnalia
 Sayaqan

References

Sources
Kadim Diller ve Yazılar, Haluk Berkmen - Noel ve Nardugan

External links 
 Nardugan Bayramı
 Çam Süsleme
 Nardugan, M. İlmiye Çığ
 (http://www.hurriyetdailynews.com/default.aspx?pageid=438&n=the-christmas-tree-made-in-turkistan-2009-12-24)
Turkic mythology
December observances
Christmas-linked holidays